The WCCW Middle Eastern Championship was a short-lived professional wrestling championship promoted by World Class Championship Wrestling (WCCW). It was a minor championship, created for and only defended during WCCW's tours of Israel and was never defended in the United States. Mike Von Erich defeated Gino Hernandez, in what was billed as the finals of a tournament, but in reality there was no tournament leading up to the title match on August 7, 1985. The championship was abandoned in 1987, never mentioned after Mike Von Erich's death. As it is a professional wrestling championship, it is won not by actual competition, but by a scripted ending to a match.

Title history

See also
 Professional wrestling in Israel

Footnotes

References

World Class Championship Wrestling championships
Regional professional wrestling championships
Professional wrestling in Israel